United Nations Security Council resolution 513, adopted unanimously on 4 July 1982, after recalling resolutions 508 (1982), 509 (1982), 512 (1982) and the Geneva Conventions, the council expressed its alarm at the deteriorating humanitarian situation in west Beirut and southern Lebanon.

The resolution called on Israel, Lebanon and all other parties concerned to respect the rights of the civilian population, and to restore vital supplies of water, electricity, food and medical provisions. The council also commended the work of the Secretary-General and international aid agencies to alleviate the suffering of the civilian population.

See also
 1982 Lebanon War
 Blue Line
 Israeli–Lebanese conflict
 List of United Nations Security Council Resolutions 501 to 600 (1982–1987)

References
Text of the Resolution at undocs.org

External links
 

 0513
Israeli–Lebanese conflict
 0513
1982 in Israel
1982 in Lebanon
 0513
July 1982 events